Chadwick Reuben Coombes (born 9 September 1983) is a New Zealand born association footballer who plays as a midfielder for Waitakere United in the ASB Premiership. Before joining Auckland City in 2004, he played for the Football Kingz in the now defunct Australian NSL.

Club career
Coombes played with the Football Kingz in the National Soccer League before it went defunct, and moved to Auckland City FC. He has represented Auckland City in their first FIFA Club World Cup appearance in 2006, in which they failed to impress, losing every game, and failing to score a single goal, however he made history when he became one of the first Auckland City players to score in the 2009 competition in which he scored the second goal in their 2–0 win over United Arab Emirates club Al Ahli.

Coombes signed for English Isthmian League Division One South club Fleet Town in September 2010. He made his debut for the club against Eastbourne Town FC away from home, and drew 1–1.

Returning to New Zealand, Coombes re-signed with Auckland City for the 2011-12 ASB Premiership. In 2012, he signed for cross town rivals Waitakere United

Coombes signed for WaiBOP United for the 2014–15 ASB Premiership season Despite showing promise for the club on the pitch, he returned to Waitakere United for the 2015–16 ASB Premiership season.

International career
Coombes made his international debut on 3 March 2010 after being called up to the national team for their pre-world cup friendly against Mexico as a replacement for Craig Henderson who was injured whilst training for his club. New Zealand would go on to lose the game 2–0.

Personal life
Coombes was a teacher of physical education and health at Rutherford College in Auckland.
He then moved to Massey High School where he continued to teach physical education and health. He also took on the role of coaching the girls first XI. He is currently the Director of Sport at Onehunga High School in Auckland.

Club career statistics

Honours
With Auckland City
 ACFC Young Player of the Year: 2004–05
 ACFC Supporters Player of the Year: 2008–09
 New Zealand Football Championship: 2004–05, 2005–06, 2006–07, 2008–09
 OFC Champions League: 2006, 2009, 2012
 2006 FIFA Club World Cup: – 7th
 2009 FIFA Club World Cup: – 5th
 2011 FIFA Club World Cup: – 7th

References

External links
 My life in sport: Chad Coombes
 Coombes pushes case for World Cup place 
 Auckland City FC profile
 
 

1983 births
Living people
Sportspeople from Hamilton, New Zealand
Association football midfielders
New Zealand association footballers
New Zealand international footballers
Expatriate soccer players in Australia
Auckland City FC players
Football Kingz F.C. players
National Soccer League (Australia) players
Fleet Town F.C. players
New Zealand Football Championship players